This article lists events from the year 2018 in Montenegro.

Incumbents
 President: Filip Vujanović (until 20 May); Milo Đukanović (from 20 May)
 Prime Minister: Duško Marković

Events

9 to 25 February – Montenegro participated at the 2018 Winter Olympics in PyeongChang, South Korea, with three competitors in two sports.
15 April – Milo Đukanović wins the presidential election with a majority of the votes.

Deaths
12 December – Pavle Strugar, military officer and convicted war criminal (b. 1933).

References

Links

 
2010s in Montenegro
Years of the 21st century in Montenegro
Montenegro
Montenegro